The 1894 Atlantic hurricane season ran through the summer and the first half of fall in 1894. The 1894 season was a fairly inactive one, with seven storms forming, five of which became hurricanes.



Timeline

Systems

Tropical Storm One 

A tropical storm formed between Cuba and Jamaica on June 6. It moved westward, remaining weak until dissipating on June 9 over the Yucatán Channel. No damage or deaths were reported.

Tropical Storm Two 

The second storm formed on August 5 in the Gulf of Mexico and drifted northward. It turned to the west-northwest, and dissipated on August 9, bringing very heavy rainfall and tornadoes.

Hurricane Three 

A tropical storm developed on August 30 and lasted until September 9. It formed between Africa and South America, east of the Lesser Antilles. It stayed out at sea and did not hit any land. It dissipated in the North Atlantic.

Hurricane Four 

On September 18 a tropical storm was first observed and lasted until September 30. It formed to the east-southeast of the Lesser Antilles. It then went back out to sea and hit South Carolina, tracked through North Carolina, and then made its way out to sea, where it eventually dissipated. On September 20, as the storm passed through the Lesser Antilles, it produced heavy rains and high winds over several islands. On Martinique, high winds and continuous, torrential rains impacted the island. Despite the intensity of the storm, there were no reports of damage in the Lesser Antilles. In Hispaniola, more than 500 homes and two churches were destroyed; numerous other structures sustained damage, mainly having their roofs blown off. The cyclone produced heavy rainfall in Florida, including  over a 54-hour period at Tampa; at Titusville,  fell in two days. In southeast Florida, a bridge on the Lake Worth Lagoon was swept away and thousands of dead fish beached at Jupiter, but otherwise only gale-force winds and occurred and damage was insignificant. The ship Jella was stranded at Hillsboro Inlet and the Emily II sank off Key West with a loss of all her crew. Many wine caskets and other debris were found on the beaches between the New River and the Lake Worth Lagoon. In all, the cyclone was responsible for an estimated 200 deaths.

Hurricane Five 

The Florida Panhandle Hurricane of 1894 
The fifth storm formed on October 1 and lasted until October 12. It tracked through Georgia, South Carolina, North Carolina, Connecticut, Massachusetts, New Hampshire, Maine, and Canada. The hurricane caused about $1,000,000 in damage (1894 USD). 10 people were killed and 15 injured in New York City when winds blew a partially constructed building onto a tenement. A girl died in her bed in Englewood, New Jersey, when the roof of her house collapsed upon her. Trees and telegraph wires were blown down and boats stranded in the New York City area.

Hurricane Six 

A tropical storm formed on October 11 southeast of the Lesser Antilles as a tropical storm. Continuing to head out to sea, the hurricane weakened, and was last plotted on October 20.

Hurricane Seven 

The final storm formed on October 21 and lasted until October 31. It formed far north of the Lesser Antilles and traveled westward towards the Bahamas, but then swerved northeast and out to sea, threatening no land. Its maximum sustained winds peaked at 110 mph (161 km/h).

See also 

 List of tropical cyclones
 Atlantic hurricane season

References

External links 
 Monthly Weather Review
 Unisys 1894 season tracks

 
Articles which contain graphical timelines
1894 natural disasters
1894 meteorology